Tierra Bonita is a census-designated place (CDP) in Cameron County, Texas, United States. The population was 141 at the 2010 census. It is part of the Brownsville–Harlingen Metropolitan Statistical Area.

Geography
Tierra Bonita is located in northwestern Cameron County at  (26.267226, -97.823184), on the northern border of the town of Santa Rosa.

Demographics
As of the census of 2000, there were 160 people, 40 households, and 34 families residing in the CDP. The population density was 155.2 people per square mile (60.0/km2). There were 41 housing units at an average density of 39.8/sq mi (15.4/km2). The racial makeup of the CDP was 78.12% White, 0.62% Native American, 18.75% from other races, and 2.50% from two or more races. Hispanic or Latino of any race were 95.00% of the population.

There were 40 households, out of which 52.5% had children under the age of 18 living with them, 70.0% were married couples living together, 15.0% had a female householder with no husband present, and 15.0% were non-families. 15.0% of all households were made up of individuals, and none had someone living alone who was 65 years of age or older. The average household size was 4.00 and the average family size was 4.50.

In the CDP, the population was spread out, with 35.0% under the age of 18, 16.9% from 18 to 24, 25.0% from 25 to 44, 15.6% from 45 to 64, and 7.5% who were 65 years of age or older. The median age was 24 years. For every 100 females, there were 95.1 males. For every 100 females age 18 and over, there were 96.2 males.

The median income for a household in the CDP was $30,179, and the median income for a family was $30,179. Males had a median income of $17,000 versus $29,583 for females. The per capita income for the CDP was $9,377. About 23.1% of families and 27.2% of the population were below the poverty line, including 46.3% of those under the age of eighteen and none of those 65 or over.

Education
Tierra Bonita is served by the Santa Rosa Independent School District.

In addition, South Texas Independent School District operates magnet schools that serve the community.

References

Census-designated places in Cameron County, Texas
Census-designated places in Texas